Brachystelma schultzei is a species of plant in the family Apocynaceae. It is endemic to Namibia.  Its natural habitat is dry savanna. It is threatened by habitat loss.

References

schultzi
Endemic flora of Namibia
Least concern plants
Least concern biota of Africa
Taxonomy articles created by Polbot